East Palestine High School is a public high school in East Palestine, Ohio, United States.  It is the only secondary school in the East Palestine City School District. Athletic teams compete as the East Palestine Bulldogs in the Ohio High School Athletic Association as a member of the Eastern Ohio Athletic Conference.

History

Various one-room schools educated students from the city's founding until the 1870s. School days began at 8:00 a.m. and were dismissed at 6:00 p.m., with a one-hour recess at noon. The subjects taught included reading, writing, arithmetic, English, grammar, geography, and German. The East Palestine School District #5 was formed by an act of the Ohio General Assembly in March 1875. Construction began on the first EPHS on Wood Street. The school opened in September 1876 with a principal and four teachers, one for primary, intermediate, and high school classes and grammar. By 1880, the enrollment had grown so that each of the first six grades had a teacher. The first graduation was held on June 12, 1885, with one graduate.

The primary schools were spun off from the higher grades starting in 1905. The West North Avenue high school building was constructed in 1912 but was converted to a junior high 24 years later as the present high school on Grant Street was completed in 1936. In the early 1960s, the district built additions to the high school and the junior high building. As part of a $5.8 million bond issue, in 1995, the district began to develop a school campus around Grant Street, which included renovating the high school with music, media, and science department expansion and additions of a new gymnasium, computer laboratories, and athletic complex. The 1912 building was demolished in 2002 as part of this development, although its Elma Sutherin wing was kept as part of a new elementary school.

Academics
According to the National Center for Education Statistics, in 2021, the school reported an enrollment of 277 pupils in grades 9th through 12th, with 184 pupils eligible for a federal free or reduced-price lunch. The school employed 22 teachers, yielding a student–teacher ratio of 12.59:1.

East Palestine High School offers courses in the traditional American curriculum.

Entering their third and fourth years, students can elect to attend the Columbiana County Career and Technical Center in Lisbon as either a part-time student, taking core courses at EPHS, while taking career or technical education at the career center, or as a full-time student instead. Students may take training in automotives, construction technology, cosmetology, culinary arts, health sciences, information technology, multimedia, landscape & environmental design, precision machining, veterinary science, and welding.

A student must earn 28 credits to graduate, including: 4 credits in a mathematics sequence, 3 credits in science, including life and physical science, 4 credits in English, 3 credits in a social studies sequence, 1 credit in fine art, 1 credit in health and physical education, 1 credit in personal finance, and 4.5 elective credits. Elective courses can be in English, science, social studies, foreign language, technology and business, family and consumer science, and fine art. Students attending the career center follow the same basic requirements but have career & technical education requirements rather than fine arts. All students must pass Ohio state exams in English I & II, Algebra I, Geometry, Biology, American History, American Government, or the like.

Notable alumni
 Wynn Hawkins – former Major League Baseball pitcher  from the Cleveland Indians. Most known for giving up Ted Williams 500th home run.
 J. T. Miller – NHL ice hockey player with the New York Rangers.
 Fred Hoaglin – former NFL player and Super Bowl XXV champion as an assistant coach with the New York Giants.

References

External links
 District Website

High schools in Columbiana County, Ohio
Public high schools in Ohio
1876 establishments in Ohio